Rosières-aux-Salines is a commune in the Meurthe-et-Moselle département in north-eastern France.

In the past, inhabitants of Rosières-aux-Salines were insultingly known by their neighbours as oua-oua (pronounced "wa-wa"), on account of a speech defect caused by a local thyroid condition, which was considered hilarious.

See also
 Communes of the Meurthe-et-Moselle department

References

Rosieresauxsalines